The Merry Wives of Windsor is a 1950 East German musical comedy film directed by Georg Wildhagen. It was based on William Shakespeare's play by the same name.

Plot
In Elizabethan England, Sir John Falstaff is embroiled in attempting to have a love affair with several women, which soon turns into a humorous adventure.

Cast
 Sonja Ziemann as Mrs. Fluth
 Camilla Spira as Mrs. Gretchen Reich
 Paul Esser as Sir John Falstaff
 Ina Halley as Anna Reich
 Eckart Dux as Fenton
 Alexander Engel as Innkeeper Reich
 Claus Holm as Mr. Fluth
 Joachim Teege as Mr. Spärlich
 Gerd Frickhöffer as Dr. Cajus
 Rita Streich as Mrs. Fluth (singing voice)
 Martha Mödl as Mrs. Gretchen Reich (singing voice)
 Sonja Schöner as Anna Reich (singing voice)
 Helmut Krebs as Fenton (voice)
 Hans Kramer as Sir John Falstaff (voice)
 Willi Heyer-Kraemer as Innkeeper Reich (singing voice)
 Herbert Brauer as Mr. Fluth (singing voice)

Production
The film is an adaptation of the 1849 opera The Merry Wives of Windsor composed by Otto Nicolai with a libretto by Salomon Hermann Mosenthal which was based on William Shakespeare's play of the same title. It was made by the state-owned DEFA studio on a large budget.

Reception
The film was highly successful by East German standards, and drew 6,090,329 viewers to the cinemas. Ernst Richter noted that while "the socially critical tone was unmistakably present in the film", it was free of "heavy-handed communist propaganda." Heinz Kersten characterized it as one of the last apolitical entertainment pictures produced by DEFA before the Socialist Unity Party of Germany tightened its control on the national film industry. Albert Wilkening wrote it was "a significant step forward in making movies in the GDR... Wildhagen's directing was quite skillful."

References

Bibliography
Sabine Hake, John Davidson (editors). Framing the Fifties: Cinema in a Divided Germany. Berghahn Books (2007). .
Ernst Richert. Agitation und Propaganda : das System der publizistischen Massenführung in der Sowjetzone. Institut für politische Wissenschaft (1958). OCLC 185953805.
Heinz Kersten. Das Filmwesen in der Sowjetischen Besatzungszone Deutschlands. Bundesministerium für Gesamtdeutsche Fragen (1963). ASIN B0000BK48Q.
Albert Wilkening. Film. VEB Bibliographisches Institut (1966). OCLC 7216389.

External links

Die lustigen Weiber von Windsor on DEFA Sternstunden.

1950 films
Films set in Windsor, Berkshire
1950s historical musical films
German historical musical films
East German films
1950s German-language films
Films directed by Georg Wildhagen
Films based on operas
Films based on The Merry Wives of Windsor
Films set in England
German films based on plays
Opera films
German black-and-white films
1950s German films